Matthías Bjarnason (15 August 1921 – 28 February 2014) was an Icelandic politician and former minister.

External links 

 Non auto-biography of Matthías Bjarnason on the parliament website

1921 births
2014 deaths
Matthias Bjarnason
Matthias Bjarnason